Five ships in the United States Navy have been named USS Milwaukee for the city in Wisconsin.

, was a monitor, launched in 1864 and sunk by enemy action in 1865.
 was a  cruiser, commissioned in 1906, wrecked attempting to salvage  and decommissioned in 1917.
It was commissioned in November 2015 in Milwaukee.

United States Navy ship names